Ironheart (Riri Williams) is a superhero appearing in American comic books published by Marvel Comics. Created by writer Brian Michael Bendis and artist Mike Deodato, the character first appeared in Invincible Iron Man Vol. 2 #7 (May 2016).

Dominique Thorne portrays Williams in the Marvel Cinematic Universe (MCU), first appearing in the film Black Panther: Wakanda Forever (2022) and scheduled to star in the Disney+ series Ironheart (2023).

Publication history
Riri Williams, created by Brian Michael Bendis and designed by Mike Deodato, first appeared in Invincible Iron Man Vol. 2 #7, written by Bendis and drawn by Deodato. She then made her first significant appearance two issues later.

Williams later starred in the third volume of Invincible Iron Man, starting in late 2016, under the codename Ironheart, using armor designed by Stefano Caselli, the artist of the new volume.

Controversy 
In October 2016, Marvel Comics and New York-based retailer Midtown Comics jointly decided to pull from circulation J. Scott Campbell's variant cover of the first issue of The Invincible Iron Man, produced exclusively for that store, after previews of the cover were criticized for sexualizing the depicted character, 15-year-old Riri Williams. The cover depicted the character, a teenaged MIT engineering student who reverse engineered one of Iron Man's armored suits to wear herself, in a midriff-baring crop top, in contrast to the more modest way in which artist Stefano Caselli depicted the character in the book's interior art. Campbell called the decision "unfortunate," explained that his rendition of the character was intended to depict "a sassy, coming-of-age young woman". He regarded the reaction to the cover as a "faux controversy", saying, "I gave her a sassy 'attitude'...'sexualizing' was not intended. This reaction is odd." Brian Michael Bendis, the writer on the series, was pleased with the decision to pull the cover, saying that while he liked the face Campbell had drawn on Riri when he viewed the art as a work in progress, he disliked the completed art, saying, "Specialty covers are not in my purview and it was being produced separately from the work of the people involved in making the comic. Not to pass the buck but that’s the fact. If I had seen a sketch or something I would have voiced similar concerns. I am certain the next version will be amazing."

Fictional character biography

Origins
Riri Williams is a 15-year-old engineering student and the daughter of the late Riri Williams Sr. Following her father's death, Riri lives with her mother Ronnie and her paternal Aunt Sharon in Chicago. A certified super-genius, she attends the Massachusetts Institute of Technology on scholarship. Working alone, Riri designs a suit of armor similar to the Iron Man Armor using material stolen from campus. When campus security knocks at her door, she flees while wearing the suit.

When Williams prevents two inmates from escaping the New Mexico State Penitentiary, her suit is damaged. Upon returning to her mother's house, Riri continues to work on improving the suit, much to the dismay of her aunt. Tony Stark hears of Riri's accomplishment and goes to meet her. During their meeting, Stark decides that he will endorse her decision to become a superhero.

Post-"Civil War II"
Appearing in her Rescue armor following the 2016 "Civil War II" storyline, Pepper Potts confronts Riri Williams and Tony Stark, who has transferred his consciousness into a device becoming an A.I., in an attempt to explain the problems of being a superhero. They are then attacked by Techno Golem and her Biohack Ninjas. As Riri flees and Pepper fights them, Techno Golem tries to find out how Pepper knows Riri. When Techno Golem's armor breaks and Tomoe tries to instead attack Riri, Pepper uses her Rescue armored gauntlets and knocks Tomoe out. When Sharon Carter formally meets Riri after the arrest of Tomoe and the Biohack Ninjas, Pepper tells Riri that they will talk again. Pepper Potts, Mary Jane Watson, Friday, the Tony Stark A.I., and Stark's biological mother Amanda Armstrong are in the Hall of Armor with Riri when she demonstrates her knowledge of each of the Iron Man armors. When Amanda Armstrong offers to allow Riri to use Tony Stark's labs as her base of operations, Riri is hesitant but Pepper encourages her. The next day at her home, Riri's family is visited by the head of M.I.T. She wants Riri to continue working there, as it has gotten sloppy since she left. Riri would also be allowed to use the laboratories at the school. After working in one of the labs, Riri asks the Tony Stark A.I. to find her something to blow off some steam. The Tony Stark A.I. locates Armadillo during a crime spree and Riri uses the Ironheart armor to defeat Armadillo. She is then approached by the Champions, who offer her membership into their group.

"Secret Empire"
During the 2017 "Secret Empire" storyline, Ironheart is seen fighting the Army of Evil during Hydra's takeover of the United States. Baron Helmut Zemo has Blackout surround Manhattan with Darkforce after enhancing him with the powers of the Darkhold. Riri sends a distress signal to all available heroes to meet her in Washington, D.C. Ironheart and Falcon II join up with the Champions to assist in the underground's fight against Hydra's takeover of the country. They later follow Black Widow when she makes her own plans for Captain America. During training, the young heroes disagree about Black Widow's brutality and mercilessness. The heroes later infiltrate a Hydra base to find someone crucial to Black Widow's plan. Black Widow later tells them that they are going to have to kill Steve Rogers, after Hydra destroys the Underground hideout. In Washington, D.C., as their assault begins, Spider-Man fights Captain America, but Black Widow intervenes and is killed. Just as Spider-Man is about to kill Steve Rogers, the others convince him to not do it and they all get arrested. She also helped the Champions search for survivors in Las Vegas, Nevada, after its destruction by Hydra.

Champions
In a 2019 storyline, Riri is startled to learn that her android teammate Viv Vision has developed a crush on her, which initially revolts her due to internalized homophobia. Later, her mind – and that of several other Champions – is corrupted by Mephisto's son Blackheart, turning her against her teammates. However, when Riri is about to destroy Viv, it is the latter's honest apology for not considering her feelings which snaps her out of Blackheart's control and finally makes her acknowledge Viv's affection.

During the 2020 "Outlawed" storyline, Ironheart is among the teenage superheroes affected by the Underage Superhuman Warfare Act that was drafted by Senator Geoffrey Patrick ever since Ms. Marvel was put in a coma during a fight with an Asgardian dragon. The established group C.R.A.D.L.E. raided her lab.

"Iron Man 2020"
In the "Iron Man 2020" arc, Riri is among the characters that Tony Stark in his form of Mark One has not returned the calls of. While abiding by the Underage Superhuman Warfare Act, Riri, her A.I. N.A.T.A.L.I.E. (who is based on Riri's late best friend Natalie) and Xavier King see people fleeing because the Intellicars have gone haywire. As Riri interfaces with the Intellicar, N.A.T.A.L.I.E. finds that its A.I. is corrupted with a bad code. As the Intellicar starts acting up again, Riri was able to find the reset code as the three Intellicars crash. N.A.T.A.L.I.E. informs Riri that the signal came from the cell phone of André Sims who is currently working as an intern at Stark Unlimited's Chicago branch. Three days later at Stark Unlimited's Chicago branch, Riri confronts André about the incident with the Intellicars. André denies all knowledge of the incident and states that Stark Unlimited is doing the people a favor.

Back at her lab, Riri states to N.A.T.A.L.I.E. that she has sent her complaints to Stark Unlimited and nobody has responded yet. While debating on the next plan of action with N.A.T.A.L.I.E., Riri notices that she might be glitching out. Later that night, Riri informs Xavier that N.A.T.A.L.I.E might be suffering a glitch ever since the Intellicar incident. She then gets an alert that the Ironheart armor has been hijacked. It is shown that N.A.T.A.L.I.E. has hijacked the Ironheart armor and starts glitching when she confronts André. Using the tracker in the Ironheart armor, Riri and Xavier enter Stark Unlimited where they avoid the Stark drones. They catch up to N.A.T.A.L.I.E. as Riri works to talk N.A.T.A.L.I.E. out of harming André as N.A.T.A.L.I.E. states that they can't be able to help people from being harmed by people like André. Riri states that she can't have N.A.T.A.L.I.E. doing away with André or else Riri would get arrested as she doesn't want to put her mom through that and lose N.A.T.A.L.I.E. Riri has no choice but to armor up as André recovers and blasts Xavier out the window. Ironheart manages to rescue Xavier and expose André's experiments. After watching the news revolving around the incident, Riri, N.A.T.A.L.I.E., and Xavier noticed that the Ironheart armor was listed as one of Stark Unlimited's prototypes as they suspect that Stark Unlimited covered up the fact that it was the real Ironheart. N.A.T.A.L.I.E's glitch was also taken care of.

Reception

Accolades 
 In 2019, CBR.com ranked Ironheart 10th in their "10 Smartest Heroes In The Marvel Universe" list.
 In 2020, CBR.com ranked Ironheart 6th in their "10 Most Powerful Teen Heroes In Marvel Comics" list.
 In 2021, Screen Rant included Ironheart in their "10 Most Powerful Members Of The Champions" list.
 In 2021, CBR.com ranked Ironheart 4th in their "Marvel: 10 Smartest Female Characters" list.
 In 2022, Screen Rant included Ironheart in their "MCU: 10 Most Desired Fan Favorite Debuts Expected In The Multiverse Saga" list.

Literary reception

Volumes

Ironheart - 2018 
According to Diamond Comic Distributors, Ironheart #1 was the 45th best selling comic book in November 2018.

Matt Lune of CBR.com called Ironheart #1 "new and refreshing," writing, "This may not be Ironheart’s origin, but it is her first (proper) debut as a solo character. As such, Ewing and the team call upon the lessons of past superhero debuts to craft a tale that perfectly walks the line between classically Marvel and refreshingly new. The art is vibrant and engaging, and the script is a genuine breath of fresh air that injects a new life into Riri Williams that will hopefully see this character and her adventures continue on for many years to come. Brian Bendis did a wonderful job creating this character, but Eve L. Ewing makes Ironheart her own." Jenna Anderson of Comicbook.com gave Ironheart #1 a grade of 5 out of 5, saying, "This is a genuinely stunning debut issue. Just from this first installment, it's clear that Ewing is a perfect choice to bring Riri's first solo series to life, with her injecting so much life into each line of dialogue. Whether Riri is rescuing a room full of people or connecting with an old friend, you can't help but thoroughly enjoy each scene. Libranda and Becchio's art also helps elevate things as well, creating something that feels so fresh and stunning, especially when paired with Matt Milla's color work. This book is absolutely a must-buy."

Other versions

Spider-Men II 
In the 2017 comic Spider-Men II, an alternate universe version of Riri Williams is a member of the Ultimates.

In other media

Television
 Riri Williams / Ironheart appears in Marvel Rising: Heart of Iron, voiced by Sofia Wylie. In flashbacks, Riri coped with the loss of a family member while working on her version of the prototype Iron Man armor, which strained her friendship with a girl named Natalie. In the present, she creates an A.I. named A.M.I. (voiced by Melanie Minichino), which is stolen by Hala the Accuser to be used for a doomsday device. Riri works with the Secret Warriors to disarm it, which the former succeeds in at the cost of A.M.I.'s arc reactor. Following this, Riri builds a new suit of armor and joins the Secret Warriors as Ironheart.
 Riri Williams / Ironheart appears in Marvel's Spider-Man, voiced again by Sofia Wylie. This version is an Avengers intern who lost her stepfather and has an A.I. based on Tony Stark that she calls "Not Tony" (voiced by Mick Wingert).

Marvel Cinematic Universe

Dominique Thorne portrays Riri Williams / Ironheart in media set in the Marvel Cinematic Universe (MCU).
 In November 2022, Thorne made her debut as Williams in the film Black Panther: Wakanda Forever (2022).
 In December 2020, a Disney+ television series titled Ironheart was announced. Thorne is expected to reprise her role as Williams from Wakanda Forever.

Video games
 Riri Williams / Ironheart appears as a playable character in Marvel Puzzle Quest.
 Riri Williams / Ironheart appears as a playable character in Marvel Future Fight.
 Riri Williams / Ironheart appears in Marvel Avengers Academy, voiced by Dani Chambers.
 Riri Williams / Ironheart appears as a playable character in Lego Marvel Super Heroes 2. She appears as part of the Champions DLC.
 Riri Williams / Ironheart appears as a playable character in Marvel Strike Force.
 Riri Williams / Ironheart appears in the digital collectible card game Marvel Snap.

Miscellaneous 

 In March 2017, the Massachusetts Institute of Technology's admissions department released a short, live-action video where Riri Williams / Ironheart, played by student Ayomide F., walks around campus, attends class, and builds an Ironheart suit in her dormitory.

Collected editions

References

External links
 Ironheart Ironheart
 Riri Williams at Marvel Wiki
 Riri Williams at Comic Vine

African-American superheroes
Comics characters introduced in 2016
Characters created by Brian Michael Bendis
Characters created by Mike Deodato
Fictional characters from Chicago
Fictional engineers
Fictional inventors
Fictional Massachusetts Institute of Technology people
Fictional roboticists
Homophobia in fiction
Iron Man
Teenage superheroes
Marvel Comics child superheroes
Marvel Comics female superheroes
Marvel Comics scientists